The Territorial Prelature of Itacoatiara is a Latin Church territorial prelature of the Catholic Church in Amazonas state, inland northern Brazil. It is a suffragan in the ecclesiastical province of the metropolitan Archdiocese of Manaus.

Its cathedral is the Catedral Prelatícia Nossa Senhora do Rosário, dedicated to Our Lady of the Rosary, in the episcopal see of Itacoatiara, Amazonas.

History 
 Established on July 13, 1963 as Territorial Prelature of Itacoatiara, on territory split off from its Metropolitan, the Archdiocese of Manaus.

Statistics 
As per 2014, it pastorally served 137,400 Catholics (79.1% of 173,800 total) on 58,424 km² in 13 parishes with 14 priests (8 diocesan, 6 religious), 12 lay religious (6 brothers, 6 sisters) and 2 seminarians.

Ordinaries 
(all Roman rite)

Territorial (Bishop-)Prelates of Itacoatiara 
 Francis Paul McHugh, Scarboro Foreign Mission Society (S.F.M.) (born Canada) (20 July 1965 - retired 15 July 1972), Titular Bishop of Legis Volumni (1967.08.04 – death 2003.05.06)Apostolic Administrator João de Souza Lima (1972 - 1975) while Metropolitan Archbishop of Manaus (Brazil) (1958.01.16 – resigned 1980.04.21), next Coadjutor Archbishop of São Salvador da Bahia (Brazil) (1980.04.21 – retired 1981.10.19); previously Titular Bishop of Derbe (1949.05.14 – 1955.02.06) as Auxiliary Bishop of Archdiocese of Diamantina (Brazil) (1949.05.14 – 1955.02.06), Bishop of Nazaré (Brazil) (1955.02.06 – 1958.01.16)
 Jorge Eduardo Marskell, S.F.M. (born Canada) (1975 (bishop-elect until 1978.05.05) - death 2 July 1998)
 Carillo Gritti, Consolata Missionaries (I.M.C.) (born Italy) (5 January 2000 - death 9 June 2016)
 José Ionilton Lisboa de Oliveira, Society of Divine Vocations (S.D.V.) (first native incumbent) (19 April 2017 – ...).

See also 
 List of Catholic dioceses in Brazil

Sources and external links 
 GCatholic.org, with Google satellite photo - data for all sections
 Catholic Hierarchy

Roman Catholic dioceses in Brazil
Religious organizations established in 1963
Roman Catholic Ecclesiastical Province of Manaus
Roman Catholic dioceses and prelatures established in the 20th century
Territorial prelatures